The 1937 George Washington Colonials football team was an American football team that represented George Washington University as an independent during the 1937 college football season. In its ninth and final season under head coach Jim Pixlee, the team compiled a 3–4–1 record and was outscored by a total of 105 to 104.

Schedule

References

George Washington
George Washington Colonials football seasons
George Washington Colonials football